Third-seeded pair Kathy Jordan and Anne Smith won the title after defeating Penny Johnson and Paula Smith in the final.

Seeds
A champion seed is indicated in bold text while text in italics indicates the round in which that seed was eliminated.

Draw

Finals

Top half

Bottom half

References

External links

U.S. Clay Court Championships
1979 U.S. Clay Court Championships